Richard Coutu (born May 3, 1951) is a Canadian former professional ice hockey goaltender. He was selected by the Minnesota North Stars in the fifteenth round (117th overall) of the 1971 NHL Amateur Draft; he was the final pick that year.

Between 1974 and  1976, Coutu played 24 games (9-13-1, 4.11 GAA) in the World Hockey Association with the Chicago Cougars (two seasons) and Cincinnati Stingers (one season).

References

External links

1951 births
Living people
Canadian ice hockey goaltenders
Chicago Cougars players
Cincinnati Stingers players
Cleveland Barons (1937–1973) players
Hampton Gulls (SHL) players
Ice hockey people from Montreal
Long Island Cougars players
Minnesota North Stars draft picks
Toledo Hornets players